Beate Bille may refer to

Beate Clausdatter Bille, a 16th-century Danish noblewoman and mother of Tycho Brahe
Beate Bille (actress), a Danish actress and a descendant of Beate Clausdatter Bille